Jutatip Maneephan (born 8 July 1988) is a Thai road bicycle racer and track cyclist, who rides for UCI Women's Continental Team .

Career
Maneephan was born and raised in the Roi Et Province in Thailand's Northeast region.

Maneephan began her cycling career as a track cyclist. She competed at the 2008, 2009 and 2010 UCI Track Cycling World Championships. She switched to road racing and was the gold medalist in the women's road race competition during the 2009 Southeast Asian Games (SEA Games). She competed at the 2012 Summer Olympics in the Women's road race, but failed to finish.

Maneephan was recruited to ride for the Italian pro team  after her performance at the 2012 Olympic Games in London, though her debut on the team was delayed after she was hit by a pickup truck during a training ride, breaking two ribs. She competed at the 2016 Olympics.

Major results

Road
Source: 

2009
 1st  Road race, Southeast Asian Games
2010
 3rd  Road race, Asian Road Championships
 7th Road race, Asian Games
2011
 2nd Time trial, National Road Championships
 3rd  Road race, Asian Road Championships
2012
 1st Stage 1 The Princess Maha Chackri Sirindhorn's Cup "Women's Tour of Thailand"
 2nd Overall Tour of Zhoushan Island
 3rd  Road race, Asian Road Championships
 6th Overall Tour of Chongming Island
2013
 2nd  Road race, Southeast Asian Games
2014
 1st  Road race, Asian Games
 2nd Overall The Princess Maha Chackri Sirindhorn's Cup "Women's Tour of Thailand"
1st Stage 1
 2nd Overall Biwase Cup
1st Stages 5 & 8
 4th Road race, Asian Road Championships
2015
 Southeast Asian Games
1st  Criterium
2nd  Road race
 National Road Championships
1st  Road race
1st  Time trial
 6th Overall The Princess Maha Chackri Sirindhorn's Cup "Women's Tour of Thailand"
 10th Tour of Chongming Island World Cup
2016 
 1st Overall Tour of Udon
1st Points classification
1st Stages 1 & 2 
 1st Udon Thani's Anniversary International Cycling
 5th Overall The Princess Maha Chackri Sirindhorn's Cup "Women's Tour of Thailand"
1st Points classification
2017
 3rd  Criterium, Southeast Asian Games
2018
 The Princess Maha Chackri Sirindhorn's Cup "Women's Tour of Thailand"
1st Stages 1b & 3
 Biwase Cup
1st Stages 1, 4, 7 & 8
 5th Overall Panorama Guizhou International Women's Road Cycling Race
2019
 1st  Overall The Princess Maha Chackri Sirindhorn's Cup "Women's Tour of Thailand"
1st  Points classification
1st  Asian rider classification
1st Stages 1 & 3
 1st The 60th Anniversary 'Thai Cycling Association' - The Golden Era Celebration
 2nd Overall The 60th Anniversary Thai Cycling Association
1st Points classification
1st Stage 1 
 2nd Overall Tour of Chongming Island
2020
 1st  Road race, National Road Championships
 1st  Overall The Princess Maha Chackri Sirindhorn's Cup "Women's Tour of Thailand"
1st  Asian rider classification
1st Stages 1 & 2
2021
 3rd Overall The Princess Maha Chackri Sirindhorn's Cup "Women's Tour of Thailand"
1st Stage 3
2022
 1st  Road race, National Road Championships
 The Princess Maha Chackri Sirindhorn's Cup "Women's Tour of Thailand"
1st  Points classification
1st Stages 1 & 3

Track

2013
 3rd Scratch, ACC Track Asia Cup – Thailand Round
2015
 Track Clubs ACC Cup
2nd Keirin
3rd Scratch	 	 
2019
 National Track Championships
1st  500m time trial
1st  Sprint
2nd Individual pursuit
2nd Keirin

References

External links
 
 
 
 Prachachat Thurakit profile

1988 births
Living people
Jutatip Maneephan
Jutatip Maneephan
Cyclists at the 2012 Summer Olympics
Cyclists at the 2016 Summer Olympics
Cyclists at the 2020 Summer Olympics
Jutatip Maneephan
Asian Games medalists in cycling
Cyclists at the 2010 Asian Games
Cyclists at the 2014 Asian Games
Jutatip Maneephan
Jutatip Maneephan
Southeast Asian Games medalists in cycling
Jutatip Maneephan
Jutatip Maneephan
Medalists at the 2014 Asian Games
Cyclists at the 2018 Asian Games
Competitors at the 2009 Southeast Asian Games
Competitors at the 2015 Southeast Asian Games
Jutatip Maneephan
Competitors at the 2021 Southeast Asian Games